Richard Reid (born 1973) is a British convicted terrorist who attempted to detonate a shoe bomb.

Richard Reid may also refer to:

Richard Reid (cricketer) (born 1958), New Zealand cricketer
Richard Gavin Reid (1879–1980), Canadian politician
Richard Reid (Northern Ireland politician), Northern Irish politician for Mid Ulster
Richard Reid (actor) (born 1984), British actor
Richard Reid (entertainment reporter) (born 1968), American-Australian entertainment reporter and winner of I'm a Celebrity...Get Me Out of Here! (Australia season 5)
Ric Reid (born 1969), New Zealand cyclist
Richie Reid (born 1956), Irish hurler
Richie Reid (hurler, born 1993), Irish hurler

See also
Richard Read (born 1957), American journalist
Richard Read Sr., British-born artist sent to Australia as a convict
Richard Reed (born 1973), British businessman
Richard F. Reed (died 1926), justice of the Supreme Court of Mississippi
Rick Reed (disambiguation)
Reed Richards, also known as Mr. Fantastic, a fictional superhero